Zoomlion Heavy Industry Science and Technology Co., Ltd. is a Chinese construction machinery and agricultural machinery manufacturer. Its headquarters are in the Zoomlion Science Park in Changsha, Hunan, China. Zoomlion is China's largest and world's fifth largest construction machinery enterprise.

History

Founded in 1992 as Changsha Hi-tech Development Area Zoomlion Construction Mechanical Industry Company, one of its first products were concrete pumps.  The company grew out of a subsidiary founded in 1956 in Beijing, as part of the first Ministry of Machinery Industry, Ministry of Construction, Central Enterprise Work Committee.

Early acquisition of state-owned assets
Early development included the merging of several smaller, preexisting entities with Zoomlion including the former Concrete Machinery Research Office and remnants of the Changsha Construction Machinery Research Institute.

IPO
Marking its transition to a public company, Zoomlion made an initial public offering on the Shenzhen Stock Exchange on Oct 12, 2000, soon after acquiring ISO9001 certification.

Overseas asset acquisitions
A rarity at a time when developing country companies seldom acquired their developed country counterparts, Zoomlion bought the British company Powermole in the early 2000s.

In 2008, Zoomlion made another foreign acquisition with the purchase of Italian concrete machinery manufacturer, Compagnia Italiana Forme Acciaio SpA (Cifa), in an equity link-up with Goldman Sachs, Mandarin Capital Partners, and  Hony Capital.

CCTV presentation
Having been previously featured in a 2001 CCTV documentary, an advertisement for the company was also presented on CCTV in May 2004.

Accusations of Fraud
In May 2013, Chinese newspaper New Express reported on alleged fraud at Zoomlion. This caused Zoomlion to temporarily suspend trading of its stock and later resulted in a 9% decrease in its share price. Zoomlion accused the reporter Chen Yongzhou of "damaging business interests" and he has since been arrested. In October, 2013, New Express published a large front-page plea for his release.

Chery Heavy Industry acquisition 
In August 2014, Zoomlion purchased a majority share in the agricultural machinery maker Chery Heavy Industry. Zoomlion purchased 60 percent of the company for 2.08 billion yuan. With this acquisition Zoomlion intended to modernize China's agricultural machinery industry and compete with foreign brands that still dominate a big part of the medium and high-end large farm machinery market in China.

Environmental unit sale 
Due to financial difficulties following a long term slow down in the Chinese construction industry Zoomlion sold its environmental unit in May 2017 for 11.6 billion yuan (US$1.7 billion). This came after the company reported a 929 million yuan loss in the 2015/16 period.

Products

Products are mainly truck-mounted, purpose-specific machinery; heavy machinery and include:
bulldozers, concrete machinery, cranes (mobile cranes, tower cranes, etc.), excavators, fire apparatus, garbage compactor machinery, garbage trucks, loaders, asphalt pavers, pile foundation rotary drilling rigs, road rollers, snowplows, street sweepers, and various other road surface vehicles.

Zoomlion also sells agricultural machinery and include: tractors, combine harvesters and sugarcane harvesters. 

Zoomlion has at least four brand names, including its own.
AA
Puyuan
Zhongbiao

Operations

Subsidiaries
All of the following may be subsidiaries or divisions of Zoomlion.

Changsha Construction Machinery Research Institute
Changsha Zoomlion Haiqiang Concrete Co Ltd
China Engineer Machinery Academy Concrete Machinery Session
Compagnia Italiana Forme Acciaio SpA (Cifa) – acquired in 2008
Hunan Machinery Branch Company
Hunan Machine Tool Works – acquired on December 21, 2002
Hunan Zoomlion International Trade Co Ltd – located in Zoomlion Science Park, Changsha, Hunan it oversees  export of Zoomlion products.
Powermole Company – acquired on November 23, 2001
Puyuan Group and Puyuan Engineer Machinery Co Ltd
Zoomlion Bus Branch Company
Zoomlion Finance & Leasing Co Ltd
Zoomlion North Branch Company
Zoomlion Hoisting Machinery Branch Company – originally located in Changde, moved to Changsha in June, 2006
Zoomlion Puyuan Branch Company
Puyuan Group Co Ltd – this unit has produced cranes
Zoomlion Puyuan Special Vehicle Branch Company
Zoomlion Xinxing Construction Machinery Leasing Co Ltd
Zoomlion Zhongbiao Branch Company
Zoomlion Zhongke Beidou

Production bases and facilities
Zoomlion owns 9 industrial parks, and at least one factory, the Puyuan Group Chassis Factory. Sites include:
Zoomlion Science Park in Changsha, Hunan
CIFA in Milan, Italy
Huayin Industrial Park in Huayin, Shaanxi
Ruanjiang Industrial Park in Yuanjiang, Hunan
Guanxi Industrial Park in Changde, Hunan
Songjiang Industrial Park in Songjiang, Shanghai
Majiahe Industrial Park in Wangcheng District, Hunan
Quantang Industrial Park in Changsha, Hunan
Lugu Industrial Park in Lugu, Changsha, Hunan

References

External links

Construction equipment manufacturers of China
Agricultural machinery manufacturers of China
Tractor manufacturers of China
Chinese brands
Companies listed on the Shenzhen Stock Exchange
Companies listed on the Hong Kong Stock Exchange
Companies based in Changsha
Chinese companies established in 1992
Manufacturing companies based in Hunan